Leonard Thomas Lake (October 29, 1945June 6, 1985), also known as Leonard Hill and a variety of other aliases, was an American serial killer. During the mid-1980s, he and his accomplice, British Hong Kong-born Charles Ng, raped, tortured and murdered an estimated eleven to twenty-five victims at a remote cabin near Wilseyville, California, in the Sierra Nevada foothills, located 150 miles east of San Francisco. After his 1985 arrest on unrelated charges, Lake swallowed cyanide pills that he had sewn into his clothing and died four days later. Human remains, videotapes, and journals found at Lake's cabin later confirmed Ng's involvement, and were used to convict Ng on eleven counts of capital murder.

Early life
Leonard Lake was born in San Francisco, California. When he was six years old, his parents separated, whereupon he and his siblings moved in with their maternal grandmother. Lake was reportedly a bright child, but after habitually photographing his sisters nude, which his grandmother apparently encouraged, he became obsessed with pornography. He then reportedly extorted his sisters to perform sexual acts. Lake also collected mice and killed them by dissolving them in chemicals, in the same manner he would later dispose of his human victims' corpses.

After attending Balboa High School, Lake enlisted in the United States Marine Corps in 1964. He served two tours of duty in the Vietnam War as a radar electronics technician. During this period, Lake was first diagnosed with schizoid personality disorder. After what was termed a "delusional breakdown" in Da Nang, he received psychotherapy and, in 1971, a medical discharge.

Lake settled in San Jose and enrolled at San Jose State University, but dropped out after one semester upon becoming enamored of the hippie lifestyle in San Francisco. He moved to a commune there, and married briefly in 1975. The marriage dissolved after his wife discovered that he was making and appearing in amateur pornographic movies, usually involving bondage or sadomasochism.

For the next eight years, Lake lived at the Greenfield Ranch, a 5,600 acre back-to-the-land settlement near Calpella, north of Ukiah, California. There, he met and eventually married Claralyn Balazs — nicknamed "Cricket" — who became involved in Lake's fantasies and appeared in many of his pornographic films. Lake's growing fear of impending nuclear holocaust prompted him to begin construction of a "bunker" on the settlement grounds, until the owner of the property became aware of the project and ordered it halted.

Murders

Lake met fellow former Marine Charles Ng, originally from Hong Kong, through a survivalist magazine advertisement he placed in 1981. In 1984, Ng was dishonorably discharged after serving time for theft and desertion, and Lake invited him to share a cabin near Wilseyville that had belonged to Balazs's family. Next to the cabin, Lake had built a structure described in his journals as a "dungeon". He probably had already murdered his brother, Donald Lake, and his friend Charles Gunnar, stealing their money and Gunnar's identity.

Over the next year, Lake and Ng began a pattern of rape, torture, and murder. Leonard Lake and Charles Ng are confirmed to have murdered at least eleven people. Because of the massive amount of burned, shattered bone fragments found at Lake’s cabin, they are thought to have killed as many as fourteen others. Their victims included their neighbor Lonnie Bond, his girlfriend Brenda O'Connor, their infant son Lonnie Jr., as well as Harvey and Deborah Dubs and their young son Sean. According to court records, they killed the men and infants immediately but kept the women alive, raping and torturing them, before killing them or allowing them to die from their injuries. Other known victims included relatives and friends who came looking for Bond and O'Connor, two gay men (one of whom survived), and some workmates of Ng.

Lake and Ng targeted women but were not hesitant to abduct entire families. After killing the men and children to get them out of the way, they would hold the women captive in a custom-built room in a bunker at Lake's ranch, tie them up and torture and rape them, videotaping each other while doing so. Sometimes they also lured men to the compound with promises of work but would instead rob them, after which Lake stole their identities. After killing the victims by either strangling or shooting them, they would often bury them in shallow graves on the property, although there is evidence that some were also dismembered and burned and their remains scattered.

Victims
 December 1982 - Army veteran Donald Lake, 32, was living with his mother, Gloria, in San Francisco, California when his brother Leonard stopped by on a road trip up north and asked Donald to come along. Donald was described as a very nice, gentle man by acquaintances but Leonard treated Donald terribly when they were growing up and even referred to him as a "leech" in conversations with his ex-wife Claralyn Balazs. Donald was never seen again, and his mother reported him missing. Leonard resurfaced on New Year's Day in 1983 to rent a room in a house in Golden Gate Park under his brother Donald's name.
 May 22, 1983 - Four months later, Lake moved in with his friend, Charles Gunnar, 36. Gunnar was a former postman and drama coach from Morgan Hill who was best man at Lake’s wedding. They had a lot in common as they both valued survival skills and the weaponry world. On May 22, Lake invited Gunnar to go on a road trip to Las Vegas or Tahoe for rest and relaxation after his divorce. Gunnar left his two daughters with a babysitter. A couple of days later, Lake returned alone in Gunnar’s van and told the babysitter that Gunnar ran off with a woman. Charles Gunnar was never seen again.
 April 1984 - Jeffrey D. Askren, 30 of Sunnyvale vanished in April 1984. His late model Honda automobile was found a few days later in the West Point area of Calaveras County, near Lake’s home.
 July 11, 1984 - Donald Giulietti, 36, a radio personality from San Francisco, California was spending time in his apartment expecting a visitor. Giulietti was an openly gay man who lived with another man named Richard Carrazza. Giulietti placed a personal ad in a low-key newspaper offering to give oral sex to straight men. That night a stranger knocked on the door and Giulietti assumed it was someone taking him up on his offer. As soon as Giulietti opened the door, a man whipped out a pistol and shot him in the head at close range. Carrazza ran from the back room into the study and found Giulietti on the floor. Carrazza was also immediately shot in the chest and left for dead. The shooter fled and Carrazza survived the attack. Carrazza called 911 and when the police questioned him, he was able to give a description of the shooter. Carrazza described being shot by a small Chinese man wearing prescription glasses. Carrazza would go on to identify Charles Ng as the shooter. 
 July 25, 1984 - Harvey Dubs, 29; Deborah Dubs, 33; Sean Dubs, 1, lived in San Francisco, California in 1984. Harvey was selling video equipment in July of that year and placed an advertisement in a local newspaper. Deborah was speaking on the telephone to a friend on July 25 when the doorbell rang at their family's apartment. Deborah told her friend that she had to end the conversation, as two men who were interested in the items had arrived at their home. Deborah, Harvey, and Sean have never been heard from again. One of the Dubs family's neighbors saw an Asian man leave their residence with a box later in the day. The same neighbor observed an unidentified vehicle drive away from the Dubs's apartment on July 26, the day after the family disappeared. The neighbor attempted to follow the car, but she lost the vehicle in traffic. A man identifying himself as 'Jim Bright' called Harvey's employer shortly afterward and claimed that the family moved to Washington. The unidentified man terminated the conversation when Harvey's employer became suspicious. A receipt in Harvey Dubs's name was discovered at Lake's compound, but the family's remains have never been recovered. It is believed that the Dubs were forcibly abducted from their home and murdered at the ranch. Videotape equipment from the Dubs’ San Francisco home was found at Lake’s cabin in Calaveras County.
 October 1984 -  Randy Jacobson, 36 of San Francisco, disappeared from his Haight Ashbury rooming house after becoming involved in a business deal with Lake.
 November 2, 1984 - Paul Cosner, 40, was last seen in San Francisco, California on November 2. He was employed as a used car dealer at the time of his disappearance. His gold or orange 1980 Honda Prelude disappeared with him. Cosner had advertised the vehicle for sale in a local newspaper and told his fiancée that he had found a potential buyer, whom he described as "weird." He said he was leaving his apartment at 7:30 p.m. to meet the buyer and would return at 8:00 p.m. to watch a television program with her. He has never been heard from again. Lake was arrested with Cosner’s car on June 2, 1985.
 January 20, 1985 - Clifford Peranteau, 23, was employed at Dennis Moving Company in San Francisco, California in 1985. Witnesses told authorities that he often argued with one of his co-workers, Charles Chitat Ng. Peranteau was last seen in San Francisco on January 20. He has never been heard from again. Several of his personal belongings were discovered shortly afterwards in an apartment owned by Ng, as well as in the cabin Ng frequented with his friend, Leonard Lake. 
 February 24, 1985 - Jeff Gerald, 25, was last seen in San Francisco, California on February 24. He has never been heard from again. He worked by day with Ng as a mover and spent evenings playing drums for the band Crash And Burn. He vanished in February after saying he was going to help Ng move.
 April 12–19, 1985 - In San Francisco on April 12, 1985, Kathleen Allen, 18, and her boyfriend Michael Carroll, 23, were spending time in a motel room where they were temporarily living. At 10 p.m. at night, Carroll told Allen that he had to do something and would be back in the morning. Carroll never returned. A few days later Allen received a phone call at work. The caller told her that her boyfriend Michael may have been involved in a shooting. She immediately told her boss that she had to leave. She was last seen meeting a bearded man in the parking lot of the Safeway where she worked. Allen got into the car and was never seen again. Allen appeared in a videotape found at Lake’s home and her last paycheck was sent to the town near his cabin, according to San Jose police. Carroll was also mentioned on one of the videotapes. His driver’s license was found at the cabin.
 April 19, 1985 - Robin Scott Stapley, 26, who went by his middle name lived in San Francisco with Lonnie Bond Sr., 27, and his live-in girlfriend Brenda O’Connor, 19, and their son, Lonnie Bond Jr., 2. Lonnie Sr and O'Connor disliked their neighbour, Leonard Lake, who they claimed was "extremely obnoxious, rude, and demented". Lake constantly fired weapons on his property and O'Connor felt really uncomfortable with him because he would not stop asking her to pose naked for him. On April 19, 1985, Robin Stapley was present when Lonnie Sr. decided to confront Lake, and none of them were ever seen again. Calaveras County Sheriff Claud Ballard said investigators believe O’Connor appeared in a videotape in which she was forced at gunpoint to perform sex acts. Police also say that Lake had Stapley’s identification on him when arrested.

Arrest and suicide 
On June 2, 1985, Ng was caught shoplifting a vise from a hardware store in South San Francisco and fled the scene. Lake later drove to the store and attempted to pay for the vise, but by then police had arrived. Officers noticed that Lake bore no resemblance to the photo on his driver's license, which carried the name of Robin Scott Stapley, a San Diego man reported missing by his family several weeks earlier. Lake was arrested after a gun equipped with a prohibited silencer was found in the trunk of his vehicle, a 1980 Honda Prelude, and was later positively identified via a fingerprint search. While in custody, he swallowed cyanide pills that he had sewn into his clothes, and died four days later.

The license plate on Lake's vehicle was registered to him, but the Honda itself was registered to Paul Cosner, who had disappeared from San Francisco in November 1984. Lake's auto registration led detectives under the command of San Francisco Police Homicide Lieutenant Gerald McCarthy to the property in Wilseyville, where they found Stapley's truck and Bond's car, and the dungeon. In a makeshift burial site nearby, police unearthed roughly forty pounds of burned and crushed human bone fragments corresponding to a minimum of eleven bodies. 

Two bodies, later identified as Bond and Stapley, had been gagged and executed by gunshots to the head. Police also found a hand-drawn "treasure map", leading them to two buried five-gallon buckets. One contained an assortment of ID papers and personal possessions, suggesting that the total victim count could be as high as twenty-five. In the other were Lake's handwritten journals for the years 1983 and 1984, and two videotapes documenting their torture of Brenda O'Connor and Deborah Dubs. In one of the tapes, Ng is seen telling O'Connor, "You can cry and stuff, like the rest of them, but it won't do any good. We are pretty ... cold-hearted, so to speak." In the other, Dubs is shown being assaulted so severely that she "could not have survived".

Lake's wife, Claralyn Balazs, cooperated with investigators and received legal immunity from prosecution. Court records stated that Balazs turned over weapons and other material to authorities during the investigation. She was called as a key witness in Ng's trial in 1999. Yet in a surprise move, Ng's lawyer, William Kelley, dismissed Balazs without asking any questions. Kelley later declined to explain his actions. Balazs was on the witness stand for a few minutes as Kelley read sections of her immunity agreement. Balazs had been expected to shed light on what happened inside the mountain cabin that her parents owned.

Ng, who had never legally obtained U.S. citizenship, was captured in Calgary, Alberta, Canada, for shoplifting and wounding a security guard in 1985. He served four and a half years in prison there, and tried to fight extradition to the United States on the grounds that he would be subject to capital punishment. In 1991 he was extradited to California, where he was indicted on twelve counts of first-degree murder. Despite the video evidence, and the detailed information in Lake's diaries, Ng maintained that he was merely an observer and that Lake planned and committed all of the kidnaps, rapes, and murders unassisted. 

In February 1999, Ng was convicted of eleven of the twelve homicides — six men, three women, and two male infants. Jurors deadlocked on the twelfth charge, but Ng was sentenced to death. The presiding judge noted, "Mr. Ng was not under any duress, nor does the evidence support that he was under the domination of Leonard Lake." , Ng was still incarcerated at San Quentin State Prison. The last execution in California was in 2006. In 2019, Governor Gavin Newsom signed an executive order placing a moratorium on the death penalty in California.

See also

House on the Hill

General:
 List of serial killers in the United States
 List of serial killers by number of victims

References

External links

1945 births
1985 deaths
1985 suicides
20th-century American criminals
American male criminals
American people convicted of theft
American rapists
American murderers of children
American serial killers
Crime in California
Criminals from California
Criminals of the San Francisco Bay Area
Family murders
Filmed killings
Fratricides
Male serial killers
People from Mendocino County, California
People from San Francisco
People who committed suicide in prison custody
People with schizoid personality disorder
Serial killers who committed suicide in prison custody
Suicides by cyanide poisoning
Suicides in California
Torture in the United States
United States Marines
United States Marine Corps personnel of the Vietnam War